Sandra Taváres (born 2 September 1962) is a Mexican hurdler. She competed in the women's 100 metres hurdles at the 1988 Summer Olympics.

References

External links
 

1962 births
Living people
Athletes (track and field) at the 1987 Pan American Games
Athletes (track and field) at the 1991 Pan American Games
Pan American Games competitors for Mexico
Athletes (track and field) at the 1988 Summer Olympics
Mexican female hurdlers
Olympic athletes of Mexico
World Athletics Championships athletes for Mexico
Place of birth missing (living people)
Central American and Caribbean Games medalists in athletics
Central American and Caribbean Games bronze medalists for Mexico
20th-century Mexican women
21st-century Mexican women